The Episcopal Conference of the Pacific (CEPAC) is the episcopal conference of the Catholic Church that includes the bishops of several islands in Oceania. The CEPAC is a member of the Federation of Catholic Bishops' Conferences of Oceania, FCBCO.

Member dioceses of CEPAC

Ecclesiastical Province of Agaña
Archdiocese of Agaña (Guam)
Diocese of Chalan Kanoa (Northern Mariana Islands)
Diocese of Caroline Islands (Palau and Federated States of Micronesia)
Apostolic Prefecture of the Marshall Islands (Marshall Islands)

Ecclesiastical Province of Nouméa
Archdiocese of Nouméa (New Caledonia)
Diocese of Port-Vila (Vanuatu)
Diocese of Wallis et Futuna (Wallis and Futuna)

Ecclesiastical Province of Papeete
Archdiocese of Papeete (French Polynesia)
Diocese of Taiohae or Tefenuaenata (French Polynesia)

Ecclesiastical Province of Samoa-Apia
Archdiocese of Samoa–Apia (Samoa)
Diocese of Samoa–Pago Pago (American Samoa)
Mission Sui Iuris of Tokelau (Tokelau)

Ecclesiastical Province of Suva
Archdiocese of Suva (Fiji)
Diocese of Rarotonga (Cook Islands)
Diocese of Tarawa and Nauru (Kiribati and Nauru)
Mission Sui Iuris of Funafuti (Tuvalu)

Immediately Subject to the Holy See
Diocese of Tonga (Tonga and Niue)

Presidents of CEPAC
Cardinal Soane Patita Paini Mafi ( (2010.06 – 2016.09)
Archbishop Anthony Sablan Apuron, O.F.M. Cap. (2003.08 – 2010.06)
Archbishop Michel-Marie-Bernard Calvet, S.M. (1996 – 2003)
Archbishop Anthony Sablan Apuron, O.F.M. Cap. (1991 – 1996)
Bishop Francis-Roland Lambert, S.M. (1987 – 1991)
Archbishop Petero Mataca (1982 – 1987)
Bishop Patelisio Punou-Ki-Hihifo Finau, S.M. (1978 – 1982)
Archbishop Pierre-Paul-Émile Martin, S.M. (1971 – 1978)
Archbishop George Hamilton Pearce, S.M. (1970 – 1971)

Seminary
Pacific Regional Seminary, created in 1970 and opened in 1972

References

External links
 Catholic Hierarchy: Catholic Church in Pacific (Oceania) 
 GCatholic: Conferentia Episcopalis Pacificae

Pacific
+
Catholic Church in Oceania